The following is a partial list of Recorded Texas Historic Landmarks (RTHLs) arranged by county as designated by the Texas Historical Commission and local county historical commissions in Texas. This page includes RTHLs in the following counties: Sabine, San Augustine, San Jacinto, San Patricio, San Saba, Schleicher, Scurry, Shackelford, Shelby, Sherman, Smith, Somervell, Starr, Stephens, Sterling, Stonewall, Sutton, Swisher, Tarrant, Taylor, Terrell, Terry, Throckmorton, Titus, Tom Green, and Travis.

KEY

Landmarks with multiple historic designations are colored according to their highest designation within the following hierarchy.

Sabine County

San Augustine County

San Jacinto County

San Patricio County

San Saba County

Schleicher County

Scurry County

Shackelford County

Shelby County

Sherman County

Smith County

Somervell County

Starr County

Stephens County

Sterling County

Stonewall County
There are currently no Recorded Texas Historic Landmarks listed within the county.

Sutton County

Swisher County

Tarrant County

Taylor County

Terrell County

Terry County

Throckmorton County

Titus County

Tom Green County

Travis County

See also

References

External links

 (Sabine-Travis)
Landmarks (Sabine-Travis)